Phillip Maxwell Adams (born 29 July 1945) is an Australian sport shooter. Adams has competed at four consecutive Olympic Games, between 1984 and 1996, and six  consecutive Commonwealth Games between 1982 and 2002.  He shares the record for the most medals won in Commonwealth Games with a total of eighteen medals (seven golds, nine silver, and two bronze) with English shooter Mick Gault. He has competed in the air, free, centre-fire and standard pistol, winning the Oceanian Championships in all four events.  In 1992 he won the 10m air pistol event at the Benito Juarez World Cup championships in Mexico City.

In 1991, after winning his sixth gold medal at Commonwealth Games, he was awarded the Medal of the Order of Australia for his services to the sport of pistol shooting.  He has also been inducted into the New South Wales Hall of Champions.

Compared to his outstanding results at the Commonwealth Games, his performances at the Olympic Games are less impressive, having failed to reach the final round in any of the seven events he has entered.  His best result was equal 15th in the Men's 10 metre air pistol at Seoul in 1988.

Prior to the 2002 Commonwealth Games in Manchester, Adams returned a positive drug test to the diuretic hydrochlorothiazide, which he was taking under medical advice to treat high blood pressure.  After initially being found guilty, but given no suspension as it was not considered to be performance enhancing in shooting, the decision was later overturned and he was banned for two years.

He lives in Forbes, New South Wales, where he first learned to shoot to keep vermin from his farm.

References

External links
 Profile – Australian Olympic Team

Living people
1945 births
Australian male sport shooters
Olympic shooters of Australia
Shooters at the 1984 Summer Olympics
Shooters at the 1988 Summer Olympics
Shooters at the 1992 Summer Olympics
Shooters at the 1996 Summer Olympics
Shooters at the 1982 Commonwealth Games
Shooters at the 1986 Commonwealth Games
Shooters at the 1990 Commonwealth Games
Shooters at the 1994 Commonwealth Games
Shooters at the 1998 Commonwealth Games
Shooters at the 2002 Commonwealth Games
Commonwealth Games gold medallists for Australia
Commonwealth Games silver medallists for Australia
Commonwealth Games bronze medallists for Australia
Sportsmen from New South Wales
Australian sportspeople in doping cases
Recipients of the Medal of the Order of Australia
Commonwealth Games medallists in shooting
20th-century Australian people
Medallists at the 1982 Commonwealth Games
Medallists at the 1986 Commonwealth Games
Medallists at the 1990 Commonwealth Games
Medallists at the 1994 Commonwealth Games
Medallists at the 2002 Commonwealth Games